Radio Patrol is a 1937 Universal movie serial based on the comic strip Radio Patrol.

Premise
Pat O' Hara, a police officer cop, joins forces with Molly Selkirk to try and stop an international criminal gang from getting their hands on the formula for a new flexible metal.

Cast
 Grant Withers as Officer Pat O'Hara
 Adrian Morris as Officer Sam Maloney
 Kay Hughes as Molly Selkirk
  Mickey Rentschler as Pinky Adams
 Silver Wolf as Irish, the German Shepherd
 Gordon Hart as W.H. Harrison
 Frank Lackteen as Mr. Tahata/Warner the Great
 C. Montague Shaw as Mr. Wellington
 Harry Davenport as John P. Adams, inventor
 Wheeler Oakman as Stevens, gang chemist
 Max Hoffman Jr. as Harry Selkirk
 Jack Mulhall as Desk Sergeant
 Earl Dwire as Jeremiah Crockett
 Leonard Lord as Franklin, the real Tahata
 Dick Botiller as Zutta, a henchman
 Tom London as Eddie Lewis (uncredited)
 Ray Teal as Perkins (uncredited)

Production
Radio Patrol was based on the comic strip by Eddie Sullivan and Charles Schmidt.

Stunts
 George Magrill
 Eddie Parker (doubling Grant Withers)
 Tom Steele

Chapter titles
 A Million Dollar Murder
 The Hypnotic Eye
 Flaming Death
 The Human Clue
 The Flash of Doom
 The House of Terror
 Claws of Steel
 The Perfect Crime
 Plaything of Disaster
 A Bargain with Death
 The Hidden Menace
 They Get Their Man
Source:

See also
 List of film serials
 List of film serials by studio

References

External links

1937 films
1937 crime films
American black-and-white films
1930s English-language films
Films based on comic strips
Films based on American comics
Films directed by Ford Beebe
Universal Pictures film serials
American crime films
1930s American films